The broad-leaved coral tree (Erythrina latissima) is a deciduous tree from southern Africa growing 5 to 8 m tall. It is a member of the Fabaceae and occurs naturally in the Afrotemperate mist-belt of South Africa and Eswatini to the uplands of Mozambique, Zimbabwe and adjacent Botswana. It is often cultivated as a tree for gardens and parks. In Zimbabwe its range overlaps with the similar Erythrina abyssinica.

It has pubescent branchlets and fissured, corky bark. The foliage is soft and initially woolly in texture, with some prickles and prominently raised venation below. Their scarlet flowers with red, densely velvety calyxes may appear from winter to early summer, usually before new foliage is produced. The fruit is a cylindrical articulated pod, bearing orange to red seeds with a black spot.

Gallery

References

latissima
Trees of South Africa
Trees of Africa
Ornamental trees